Punta Dúngeness is a headland at the eastern entrance of the Strait of Magellan on its north shore, opposite Cabo del Espiritu Santo in Tierra del Fuego. West of the Punta Dungeness lies the Bahía Posesión. Punta Dungeness marks the border between Chile and Argentina, and according to the Treaty of Peace and Friendship the line between Punta Dungeness and Cabo del Espiritu Santo marks the limits of each country's territorial waters and the border between the Pacific and Atlantic Ocean. It is the southernmost point on the mainland of Argentina, and the easternmost point on the mainland of Chile. There is a lighthouse on the Chilean side. This is the only place where the Atlantic Ocean touches the shores on the mainland of Chile, at the entrance to the Strait of Magellan.

The headland was named after Dungeness on the south coast of England, to which it bears some resemblance. It was named on 17 December 1766 by the English navigator Samuel Wallis.

Climate

References

Landforms of Magallanes Region
Landforms of Santa Cruz Province, Argentina
Dungeness
Dungeness
Argentina–Chile border
Strait of Magellan

External links

Video of a visit to the lighthouse